The Supreme Council of the Republic of Belarus, sometimes translated as Supreme Soviet of the Republic of Belarus, was the unicameral legislature of Belarus between 1991 and 1996.

It was essentially a continuation of the Supreme Soviet of the Byelorussian SSR of 1938–1991 immediately after the Soviet Union's collapse in 1991, which in its turn was the successor of both the All-Byelorussian Congress of Soviets (1919–1937) and its Central Executive Committee (1920–1938), and all of which had been the highest organs of state power in Belarus during 1920–1990. During 1990–1996 it functioned as a permanent parliament.

From 1991 to 1994, the chairman was both the de jure and de facto head of state of Belarus, and the post was considered equivalent to that of president.

Since 1994 the head of state has been the President of Belarus, with the executive power being the Council of Ministers of Belarus. Since 1996, the National Assembly of Belarus has been the bicameral legislature of Belarus and the President gained executive power as well as being the de facto head of government.

Chairmen of the Supreme Council

Convocations

 12th Belarusian Supreme Council
 13th Belarusian Supreme Council

References

Government of Belarus
Supreme Council of Belarus
1991 establishments in Belarus
1996 disestablishments in Belarus
Unicameral legislatures